King William IV had dismissed the Whig government of Lord Melbourne on 14 November 1834 and asked the Duke of Wellington to form a government but he declined, instead recommending Sir Robert Peel. Peel was in Sardinia at the time, so the Duke of Wellington took control of the government in a caretaker capacity until Peel returned and was able to form his government on 10 December.

List of ministers
During the caretaker government there was no Cabinet.

Notes
 Wellington was the only Secretary of State.
 As no separate Chancellor of the Exchequer had been appointed, Denman held the post pro tempore by virtue of being Lord Chief Justice.
 Most offices were in commission.

References

British ministries
Government
1834 establishments in the United Kingdom
1834 disestablishments in the United Kingdom
Ministry 2
Ministries of William IV of the United Kingdom
Cabinets established in 1834
Cabinets disestablished in 1834
1830s in the United Kingdom
Caretaker governments
Provisional governments